Stauracanthus is a genus of flowering plants in the family Fabaceae. It belongs to the subfamily Faboideae. It is sometimes treated as part of the genera Genista or Ulex.

Species 
Stauracanthus comprises the following species:
 Stauracanthus boivinii (Webb) Samp.
 Stauracanthus genistoides (Brot.) Samp.
 subsp. aphyllus (Link)Rothm.
 subsp. genistoides (Brot.)Samp.
 subsp. vicentinus (Cout.)Rothm.
 Stauracanthus spectabilis Webb

Species names with uncertain taxonomic status
The status of the following species is unresolved:
 Stauracanthus aphyllus Link
 Stauracanthus lusitanicus (L.) Cubas
 Stauracanthus nepa Samp.
 Stauracanthus spartioides Webb

References

Genisteae
Fabaceae genera